Lubmin is an Amt in the district of Vorpommern-Greifswald, in Mecklenburg-Vorpommern, Germany. The seat of the Amt is in Lubmin.

The Amt Lubmin consists of the following municipalities:
Brünzow
Hanshagen
Katzow
Kemnitz
Kröslin
Loissin
Lubmin
Neu Boltenhagen
Rubenow
Wusterhusen

Ämter in Mecklenburg-Western Pomerania